Robyn M. Millan is an American experimental physicist, best known for her work on radiation belts that surround the earth.

Education
Millan received a B.A. in Astronomy and Physics (1995), a M.A. in Physics (1999), and a Ph.D. in Physics (2002), all from the University of California, Berkeley.

Career and impact
Millan is a professor of physics and astronomy at Dartmouth College. Her research includes the use of high-altitude scientific balloon experiments to study Earth's radiation belts, specifically, the loss of relativistic electrons from the outer radiation belts into Earth's atmosphere. Millan is principal investigator for the BARREL (Balloon Array for RBSP Relativistic Electron Losses) project, in which a total of 47 balloon launches floated in the circular wind patterns above the South Pole in 2013 and 2014 and above Sweden in 2015 and 2016. Each balloon measured X-rays produced by the rain of relativistic electrons falling to Earth from the Van Allen radiation belts. The first test of BARREL—funded by NASA and also supported by NSF's Office of Polar Programs that supports logistics of all research in Antarctica—began in December 2008.

Her prior positions include research appointments at Dartmouth and at the University of California, Berkeley. Millan served on the NRC Committee on the role and scope of mission-enabling activities in NASA's space and earth science missions and on the panel on solar wind-magnetosphere interactions for the committee for a decadal strategy for solar and space physics (heliophysics).

Millan has inspired several young researchers as a positive influence on women in the area of space physics.  A former student and project manager for the SpaceX launch, Julianna Scheiman, made efforts to re-land the first stage booster and has worked for the SES-9 launch. Scheiman worked with Milan on the very early BARREL prototype payloads and conducted her senior thesis on the BARREL piggyback test flight.

Awards and honours
In 2017, Millan received the NASA Exceptional Public Achievement Medal. In 2011, Millan received the Dartmouth Dean of the Faculty award for outstanding mentoring and advising and for overall career distinction.  In 1995, Millan received the Department of Astronomy's Dorthea Klumpke Roberts award.

Selected works

References

External links
 Robyn Millan's faculty profile at Dartmouth College
 Robyn Millan on Scopus

Living people
Year of birth missing (living people)
Experimental physicists
American Antarctic scientists
Women Antarctic scientists
American women physicists
21st-century American women scientists